Mikhail Arkadyevich Svetlov, born Scheinkman (Yekaterinoslav, Russian Empire (present Dnipro, Ukraine) – 28 September 1964, Moscow, RSFSR, USSR) was a Russian poet.

Biography
Svetlov was born into a poor Jewish family. He has been published since 1917. A member of Komsomol since 1919, Svetlov was sent to the First Congress of Proletarian Writers in Moscow in 1920 and took part in the Russian Civil War as a volunteer rifleman in the same year. Two years later, Svetlov published his first collection of poems, Rails. The main theme of his works in the 1920s was the Russian Civil War. Probably the best known poem written by Svetlov, is Grenada, published in 1926. Between 1927 and 1928 he studied at the Moscow State University.

One of Svetlov's most significant works from the 1930s was the Song of Kakhovka (1935, composer Isaak Dunayevsky), which became extremely popular among Soviet soldiers during the Second World War. After 1935 Svetlov turned to dramaturgy, publishing several plays prior to 1940 and after the war.

Between 1941 and 1945, Svetlov was a special correspondent of the Red Star at the Leningrad Front, and also worked for other Soviet front newspapers. The most notable work of that period was a monologue-style poem Italian Cross (1943), full of dreams of peace and the fraternity of nations.

After a gap of about 14 years, during which Svetlov was writing only plays, he published several collections of poems, including the Horizon (1959) and the Shooting Box (1964). He also wrote songs for the 1958 animated film Beloved Beauty (Краса ненаглядная). In 1967 he was awarded the Lenin Prize posthumously for the book Verses of the Last Years.

Legacy
A minor planet 3483 Svetlov, discovered by Soviet astronomer Lyudmila Ivanovna Chernykh in 1976, is named after him.

In the Soviet-era film comedy The Diamond Arm, the male lead takes a vacation abroad (a very rare occurrence under Communist rule) on an ocean liner named in honor of Svetlov.

In December 2022 the Mikhail Svetlov street in Kyiv, Ukraine was renamed to (part of the so-called Executed Renaissance)  street.

Quote
 Eveybody's being rounded up, literally everyone. Commissars and their deputies are being moved to the Lubianka. But what is ridiculous and tragic is that we walk among these events without understanding a thing about them... We are just pathetic remnants of an era that has died... This isn't trial, but organized murder.
 Commenting on Joseph Stalin's Great Purge.

Partial list of poems
Grenada (1926)
Song of Kakhovka (1935)
Italian Cross (1943)

Bibliography
Mikhail Svetlov, Selected poems, Russian texts and English translations, Moscow Raduga Publishers, 1983

References

External links

Biography of Mikhail Svetlov (in Russian)
Lib.Ru: Михаил Светлов

1903 births
1964 deaths
Writers from Dnipro
People from Yekaterinoslav Governorate
Ukrainian Jews
Russian-language poets
Ukrainian male poets
Jewish poets
Soviet poets
Soviet male writers
20th-century Russian male writers
Soviet Jews
Moscow State University alumni
Deaths from lung cancer
Deaths from cancer in the Soviet Union
Burials at Novodevichy Cemetery
Recipients of the Lenin Komsomol Prize
Lenin Prize winners